KSUX (105.7 FM, "The Super Pig") is a radio station broadcasting a country format. The station is licensed to Winnebago, Nebraska, and serves Sioux City, Iowa. KSUX is owned by Powell Broadcasting.

History

After receiving its construction permit in 1988, KSUX began broadcasting in the summer of 1990. The station was owned by Violet Communications and broadcast a country format. Violet sold the station in 1991 to Flagship Communications, owners of KSCJ, which relocated the station from a facility near Southern Hills Mall to the KSCJ studios on Indian Hills Drive; the acquisition also saw Flagship divest Yankton-based KBCM to Park Communications. Flagship sold the station to DCP Broadcasting, and Powell acquired KSUX and KSCJ in a $3.8 million purchase in 1995.

References

External links
105.7 The Super Pig KSUX official website

Country radio stations in the United States
SUX
Radio stations established in 1990